Herichthys is a small genus of cichlid fishes. Most are endemic to Mexico, but H. cyanoguttatus is also found in southern Texas (United States), and has been introduced to central Texas and Florida. In 2015, the genus was split,  and 7 species moved into Nosferatu.

Species
There are currently 7 recognized species in this genus. Separate mitochondrial DNA analyses by Husley et al., Rican et al., and Oldfield et al., support H. minckleyi as monophyletic and sister to all other Herichthys species. Moreover, molecular analysis conducted separately by López-Fernández, et al., and De la Maza-Benignos, et al., did not support H. tamasopoensis, H. cyanoguttatus, H. teporatus, and H. carpintis as distinct from each other. However, morphological and zoogeographical analysis by De la Maza-Benignos, et al., confirmed the validity of these four species, as well as differential evolutionary trends. Analysis also supported the separation of Herichthys into three distinct geomorphological groups + H. minckleyi. These are, from South to North:

 Herichthys deppii (Heckel, 1840) (Nautla cichlid)
 Herichthys tepehua De la Maza-Benignos, Ornelas-García, Lozano-Vilano, García-Ramírez & Doadrio, 2015
 Herichthys carpintis (D. S. Jordan & Snyder, 1899) (Pearlscale cichlid, lowland cichlid)
 Herichthys tamasopoensis Artigas Azas, 1993 (Tamasopo cichlid)
 Herichthys teporatus (Fowler, 1903) (Soto la Marina cichlid)
 Herichthys cyanoguttatus (S. F. Baird & Girard, 1854) (Texas cichlid, Rio Grande cichlid)
 Herichthys minckleyi (Kornfield & J. N. Taylor, 1983) (Minkley's cichlid)

The Catalog of Fishes classifies the genus Nosferatu as synonymous with Herichthys.

References

 
Freshwater fish of Mexico
Freshwater fish of the United States
Cichlid fish of North America
Heroini
Cichlid genera
Taxa named by Spencer Fullerton Baird
Taxa named by Charles Frédéric Girard